Mahindar Pal Singh (Punjabi), is a Pakistani cricketer. He is predominantly a Right Arm Medium Fast bowler. He was the first Sikh cricketer from Pakistan.

In 2013, he signed up for the Abdul Qadir Academy. However, he was let go for being too inconsistent. Afterwards in 2016, he was picked for a fast bowlers camp in the NCA in Multan.

In 2021 Singh became the assistant manager of Peshawar Zalmi.

References

Living people
1996 births
Cricketers from Punjab, Pakistan
Pakistani Sikhs
Punjabi people